Changcheng 353 is a Type 035 submarine of the People's Liberation Army Navy.

Development and design 

In 1963, under the 1950 Sino-Soviet Treaty of Friendship, Alliance and Mutual Assistance, the Soviet Union passed to China the necessary design details in order to produce s. The Chinese variant became known as the Type 033, of which China built a total of 84 between 1962 and 1984. During the 1970s, China's ambition to create an indigenous submarine industry lead to the commissioning of Wuhan Ship Development and Design Institute (701 Institute) to design and build an improved submarine based on the Type 033 hull, named the Type 035 (Ming class). Two Type 035 boats were completed by 1974. Further improvements were deemed necessary and by the early 1980s a new and improved design, named the Type 035A were produced. The first of these improved "A" models entered service in 1982, with three more under construction. The latter three boats were completed and commissioned by 1990.

Construction and career 

She launched in October 1969 and commissioned in April 1974.

Changzheng 353 was decommissioned in 1997 and serve as a museum ship in the Tianjin Binhai Theme Park, Tianjin.

References

1969 ships
Ships built in Wuhan
Ming-class submarines
Museum ships in China